Neville Cole (19 June 1952 – 31 March 2009) was an Irish boxer. He competed in the men's lightweight event at the 1972 Summer Olympics, representing Great Britain.

Cole won the 1970 and 1972 Amateur Boxing Association British lightweight titles and the 1973 light-welterweight title, when boxing out of the Fitzroy Lodge ABC.

References

External links
 

1952 births
2009 deaths
Irish male boxers
Olympic boxers of Great Britain
Boxers at the 1972 Summer Olympics
Sportspeople from Dublin (city)
Lightweight boxers